Ronald A. Fragale has been a Democratic member of the West Virginia House of Delegates, representing the 41st District since 2000. He has served as Speaker Pro Tempore. He earlier served as a Delegate from 1990 through 1998.

External links
West Virginia Legislature – Delegate Ron Fragale official government website
Project Vote Smart – Representative Ronald A. 'Ron' Fragale (WV) profile
Follow the Money – Ron Fragale
2008 2006 2004 2002 2000 1998 campaign contributions

1950 births
Davis & Elkins College alumni
Educators from West Virginia
Living people
Democratic Party members of the West Virginia House of Delegates
Politicians from Clarksburg, West Virginia
West Virginia University alumni
21st-century American politicians